Lieuwe van Gogh (born 26 August 1991) is a Dutch painter. He had his first solo exposition in June 2022, opened by cultural historian and State Secretary of Culture and Media Gunay Uslu.

Life and career
Lieuwe van Gogh was born in Amsterdam, the son of Theo van Gogh and Heleen Hartmans. His father's great-grandfather Theo van Gogh was the brother of Vincent van Gogh.

At school Lieuwe preferred to draw rather than play soccer, starting with dragons. 

On the day his father was murdered, Lieuwe was in his classroom, a few hundred meters from where his father was shot. He was able to hear the gunshots. The day after his father's murder he painted a graffiti mural at his mother's home, but this painting was largely removed after they moved out. Van Gogh obtained his Havo diploma  and studied arts for two years. After this he became a Thaiboxer in South-East Asia.

In 2014 Van Gogh donated living cells to artist Diemut Strebe for creating a "living artwork", a replica of Vincent van Gogh's severed ear. 

Van Gogh worked 10 years as a chef. During the pandemic lockdowns he developed his own painting style. Successful sales during his first solo exposition made him realize that his work had value.

The Bed-Stuy Art Residency invited Van Gogh to paint in New York in the summer of 2022, and expose his work.

Style
He now uses the mayonnaise bottles he used as a chef, to spray paint on horizontal canvasses. This allows him to work fast, without watching paint dry. Art historian Jhim Lamoree describes Lieuwe's work as "vitalistic".

References

External links
 

Living people
1991 births
Dutch painters
Artists from Amsterdam